Wiregrass Commons Mall is an enclosed shopping mall located in Dothan, Alabama. It has  of shopping with over fifty retail stores and a food court with a carousel. It is Southeast Alabama's largest and only shopping mall. The mall's anchor tenants are Belk, Burlington Coat Factory (opened 2009), Dillard's, and JCPenney (with Sephora). The mall also includes a Jo-Ann Fabric & Crafts store.

History 
Wiregrass Commons Mall opened on August 6, 1986. The original anchors were Gayfers, Parisian, and McRae's. With the opening of Wiregrass Commons, the Porter Square Mall located near downtown Dothan closed. The mall was renovated in 2008 with an expansion to the Belk store, carpeting of the mall, removal of the fountain in center court, new lighting, and outside directional signs. CBL & Associates Properties took over management of the mall from Pennsylvania Real Estate Investment Trust in April 2016. A Sephora location opened in JCPenney in June 2016. Victoria's Secret & Pink opened a larger store in center court in July 2017.

In August 2018, Wiregrass Commons Mall was sold to Namdar Realty Group based out of New York. 

In 2021, GameStop, Dante's Pizza, Bama Fever Tiger Pride, and Chick-fil-A all left the mall due to poor management from Namdar. Dante's and Chick-fil-A have both been with the mall since it opened in 1986. Other complaints against Namdar's poor management include leaky roofs, dirty floors, and minimal security.

The mall is located at the intersection of US 231/Ross Clark Circle in northwest Dothan.

References

External links
Official Website

Shopping malls in Alabama
Buildings and structures in Dothan, Alabama
Shopping malls established in 1986
CBL Properties
Tourist attractions in Houston County, Alabama
Namdar Realty Group